Criccieth Urban District was an urban district in Criccieth, Caernarfonshire in existence between 1894 and 1974: replaced by Dwyfor

Some further details and information  on the archives here .

Urban districts of Wales
Caernarfonshire
Criccieth
1894 establishments in Wales
1974 disestablishments in Wales